The 2014 Visit Panamá Cup de Chitré was a professional tennis tournament played on outdoor hard courts. It was the first edition of the tournament for the men. It was part of the 2014 ATP Challenger Tour. It took place in Chitré, Panama, on 27 January to 2 February 2014.

Singles main draw entrants

Seeds 

 1 Rankings as of 13 January 2014

Other entrants 
The following players received wildcards into the singles main draw:
  Luis Fernando García
  Dylan Centella
  José Carlos Peralta 
  Malek Jaziri

The following players used Protected Ranking to gain entry into the singles main draw:
  Daniel Kosakowski

The following players received entry from the qualifying draw:
  Dennis Novikov
  Henrique Cunha
  Marcelo Demoliner
  Jared Donaldson

Champions

Singles 

  Wayne Odesnik def.  Jimmy Wang, 5–7, 6–4, 6–4

Doubles 

 Kevin King /   Juan-Carlos Spir def.  Alex Llompart /  Mateo Nicolás Martínez, 7–6(7–5), 6–4

External links 
 

2014
2014 ATP Challenger Tour
2014 in Australian tennis